Joseph O. Legaspi  is an American poet. He is the author of two full length poetry collections and two full-length poetry chapbooks.

With the poet Sarah Gambito, he cofounded Kundiman, a national nonprofit organization that nurtures generations of writers and readers of Asian American literature.

He is a juror of the Neustadt International Prize for Literature.

Early life and education 
Joseph O. Legaspi earned a bachelor of arts degree from Loyola Marymount University and a master's in fine arts from New York University.

Career 
Joseph O. Legaspi received a poetry fellowship from the New York Foundation for the Arts. His poem "Ode to My Mother's Hair" was anthologized in Language for a New Century (W.W. Norton). In 2016, his poem "Somebody" appeared in Poem-A-Day from the Academy of American Poets.

In April 2019, Orion Magazine chose Legaspi's poem "The Three Sparrows" as one of its top seven works for National Poetry Month.

Legaspi lives and works in New York City, where he serves on the faculty of Fordham University's Creative Writing Program.

Early life and education 
Joseph O. Legaspi was born and raised in the Philippines; his family immigrated to Los Angeles when he was 12. He earned a BA at Loyola Marymount University and an MFA from New York University.

Works 
 Imago, Cavankerry Press 2007. , 
Subways (Thrush Press 2013)
 Aviary Bestiary, Detroit, MI : Organic Weapon Arts, 2014. , 
Threshold, Cavankerry Press 2017. , 
 Postcards, Massapequa, NY : Ghostbird Press, 2019.

Awards 
 Global Filipino Literary Award

References 

Year of birth missing (living people)
Living people
American male poets
Filipino emigrants to the United States
Loyola Marymount University alumni
New York University alumni
Poets from New York (state)